La Tiza is a town and corregimiento in Las Tablas District, Los Santos Province, Panama with a population of 1,702 as of 2010. Its population as of 1990 was 1,167; its population as of 2000 was 1,662.

References

Corregimientos of Los Santos Province